Smilax walteri, common names coral greenbrier, red-berried greenbrier or red-berried bamboo, is a North American species of plants found only in the United States. It is native to coastal plains in the south-central, southeastern, and east-central parts of the country, from eastern Texas to New Jersey.

Smilax walteri is a vine climbing over other vegetation, sometimes reaching up to 6 m (20 feet) above the ground. Flowers are small and yellow-brown, hence not very showy, but the bright red or orange berries are conspicuous especially in the winter.

The species is not closely related to bamboo, despite the second common name.

References

External links
Texas Native Plants Database
Lady Bird Johnson Wildflwoer Center, University of Texas
Carolina Nature
North Carolina Wildflowers, Shrubs, & Trees by Jeffrey S. Pippen 

Smilacaceae
Flora of the United States
Plants described in 1813